The 2014 Torneio Internacional de Brasília de Futebol Feminino (also known as the 2014 International Tournament of Brasilia) was the sixth edition of the Torneio Internacional de Futebol Feminino, an invitational women's football tournament held every December in Brazil. The tournament ran from December 10–21, 2014.

Format
In the first phase, the four teams play each other within the group in a single round. The two teams with the most points earned in the respective group, qualify for the next phase. In the final stage, the first and second teams placed in the Group contest the final. If the match ends in a tie, the team with the best record in the first phase is declared the winner. The third and fourth teams placed in the group contest the third place play-off. If the match ends in a tie, the team with the best record in the first phase is declared the winner.

Venues
All matches took place at Estádio Nacional Mané Garrincha in Brasília.

Squads

Group stage
All times are local (UTC−02:00)

Knockout stage
No penalty shoot-out were held. If tied, the team with better group stage record win the match. Thus China finished third and Brazil won the tournament.

Third place match

Final

Final results

Goalscorers
5 goals
  Carli Lloyd

4 goals
  Christen Press

3 goals
  Marta
  Zhang Rui

2 goals
  Debinha
  Formiga

1 goal
  Andressa
  Andressinha
  Darlene
  Raquel
  Han Peng
  Ren Guixin
  Megan Rapinoe

References

External links
  (Portuguese)
2014 International Tournament of Brasilia on Women's Soccer United

2014 in women's association football
2014 in Brazilian women's football
2014
2014 in Chinese football
2014 in American women's soccer
2014 in Argentine football